Christopher Joseph "Gus" Loria (born July 9, 1960, in Newton, Massachusetts) is a retired United States Marine Corps Colonel and a medically retired NASA astronaut. He was originally scheduled to fly on STS-113 as pilot; however, he was grounded from spaceflight due to a severe back injury.

Personal
Colonel "CJ" Loria was born in Belmont, Massachusetts.  His mother, Joan Loria, resides in Belmont, Massachusetts and his father, Robert L. Loria is deceased.

Education
Loria graduated from Belmont High School in 1978 and the U.S. Naval Academy Preparatory School in 1979. He entered the U.S. Naval Academy shortly after and graduated with a Bachelor of Science degree in general engineering in 1983, and is a Distinguished Hispanic graduate of the Naval Academy. He later completed 30 credits of coursework toward a Master of Science degree in aeronautical engineering at the Florida Institute of Technology.  In 2004 he earned a Master in Public Administration from the John F. Kennedy School of Government at Harvard University where he was twice selected as a Harvard University Fellow.  As a Fellow he worked on clean energy technology, and  sequestration.  In June 2008 he earned an Executive Certificate in Business Management and Leadership from the MIT Sloan School of Management.

Military career

Loria received his commission after graduating from Annapolis in 1983, and was designated a Naval Aviator in July 1988. He transitioned to the F/A-18 Hornet with Strike Fighter Squadron 125 (VFA-125) at Naval air Station Lemoore, California, during August 1988 through August 1989. His next assignment was with Marine Fighter Attack Squadron 314 (VMFA-314) the "Black Knights" at Marine Corps Air Station El Toro, California. While assigned to the Black Knights he deployed to Bahrain for Operations Desert Shield and Desert Storm where he flew 42 combat missions in support of allied operations and earned three citations for valor. In 1992, while assigned as an instructor pilot to Marine Fighter Attack Training Squadron 101 (VMFAT-101) he was selected for the United States Air Force Test Pilot School at Edwards Air Force Base, California.

January 1994 to July 1996, he was assigned to the Strike Aircraft Test Squadron, Naval Air Station Patuxent River, Maryland, as an experimental test pilot. Loria distinguished himself in the areas of high angle of attack flight test, aircraft departure and spin testing, ordnance, flight controls and aircraft flying qualities testing for the F/A-18 Hornet, NASA F/A-18 ‘HARV’ thrust vectoring aircraft and the X-31A aircraft.  Colonel Loria was the Naval Test Wing Atlantic's test pilot of the year in 1995.  In 1996 he was the runner up for the Society of Experimental Test Pilot's coveted Iven C. Kinchloe Award for the test pilot of the year world-wide.

After returning to the Marine Corps from NASA, he served as the Inspector General for the 1st Marine Air Wing, Okinawa, Japan and served as the Director of Operations (J3) for Cheyenne Mountain Complex, NORAD before retiring from military service on December 1, 2008.

He has 3,079 hours of flight time and has flown 32 different aircraft.

NASA career
Loria's NASA experience includes assignment as test pilot and Project Officer for the Department of the Navy on the X-31 Program at the NASA Dryden Flight Research Facility, Edwards Air Force Base, California, from July 1994 to June 1995. He was also a test pilot on Dryden's F/A-18 High Alpha Research Vehicle or "HARV" during March 1995, conducting spin testing and the first successful excitation of the Hornet Falling Leaf out of control mode during flight test. Lead Department of the Navy test pilot on the NASA/U.S. Navy/Industry Aircraft Control Power Working Group.

Selected by NASA in April 1996 as an Astronaut Candidate, Loria reported to the Johnson Space Center in August 1996. Having completed two years of training and evaluation, he was qualified for flight assignment as a shuttle pilot. Loria was initially assigned technical duties in the Astronaut Office as an Ascent and Entry CAPCOM. Loria served as an Ascent/Entry Capcom for Space Shuttle missions STS-102 (Mar. 2001), STS-106 (Sept. 2000), STS-97 (Dec. 2000), STS-102 (Mar 2001), STS-104 (June 2001), STS-105 (June 2001).  Additionally, he served as an International Space Station (ISS) CAPCOM for Space Station Expedition III in the spring of 2001.

Assigned as pilot on STS-113, Loria was medically grounded after he experienced two herniated discs in his lower back during the summer of 2002. From September 2002 through July 2003 he served as the Chief of Flight Test for the Orbital Space Plane Program. Selected by the NASA Headquarters Executive Development Education panel, was the recipient of the coveted NASA Fellowship to the Kennedy School of Government at Harvard University. While at Harvard, Loria was selected as a Harvard University Non-Resident Fellow, Belfer Center for Science and International Affairs (a policy institute or think tank) for 2003-04 where he worked on clean energy policy.  He earned an MPA in June 2004, and was selected as a Fellow at the Center for Business and Government (a policy institute or think tank) at the Kennedy School.  Following Harvard, Loria served as the Deputy Chief Engineer for the Constellation Program at NASA Headquarters in Washington, D.C.

During the fall of 2004, Loria's injuries were deemed inoperable and resulted in his being medically disqualified from future space flight exploration missions. Loria requested assignment back to the operational forces of the Marine Corps.

He became a member of the Senior Executive Service and serves as the Director of the Earth Resources Observation and Science center (EROS), with the U.S. Geological Survey in Sioux Falls, South Dakota.

Awards and honors
 NASA Fellow
 Harvard Kennedy School Fellow
 NASA Certificate of Appreciation 2010
 NASA Acquisition Improvement Award
 NASA Group Achievement Award
 Defense Superior Service Medal
 Meritorious Service Medal (three)
 Navy Commendation Medals (two, one with "V")
 Air Medals (two, both with "V")
 Strike Flight Air Medals (four)
 Navy Achievement Medal
 Naval Test Wing Atlantic Test Pilot of the Year 1995–1996
 Who's Who in the World 1995
 Who's Who in the American West 1994
 Commodore's List with Distinction
 US Naval Academy Distinguished Hispanic Graduate
 US Naval Academy Notable Graduate

Organizations
Society of Experimental Test Pilots, U.S. Naval Academy Alumni Association, Marine Corps Aviation Association, National Rifle Association.

See also

 List of Hispanic astronauts
 Hispanics in the United States Marine Corps
 Hispanics in the United States Naval Academy

References
 
 Spacefacts biography of Christopher Loria

1960 births
Living people
American astronauts
United States Marine Corps colonels
Harvard Kennedy School alumni
United States Naval Academy alumni
U.S. Air Force Test Pilot School alumni
Recipients of the Defense Superior Service Medal
Belmont High School (Massachusetts) alumni
Hispanic and Latino American scientists